

There have been at least 8 major sieges of Baghdad.

Abbasid caliphate
In 812, Caliph Al Ma'mun sent his general Tahir ibn Husayn to capture Baghdad and depose his brother Caliph Al Amin. The siege was successful; Taher captured the city and executed the caliph.
The Siege of Baghdad (1136) by the Seljuks
The Siege of Baghdad (1157) in which the Seljuqs of Hamadan along with the Zengid of Mosul unsuccessfully besieged Baghdad.
The Siege of Baghdad (1258) was a victory for the Mongol leader Hulagu Khan, a grandson of Genghis Khan. who captured Baghdad and burnt it to the ground.

Ottoman Empire
In 1534 Ottoman  sultan Suleyman I (the Magnificent) captured the city (see Capture of Baghdad (1534))
In 1624 Abbas I of Persia (Saffavid dynasty) captured the city (see Capture of Baghdad (1624))
In 1638 Ottoman sultan Murat IV recaptured the city (see Capture of Baghdad (1638))

Modern era 
The Fall of Baghdad (1917) in which the British and Indian capture of Ottoman-controlled Baghdad during World War I.
The 2003 invasion of Baghdad with the US capture of Saddam Hussein-controlled Baghdad following the Coalition's invasion of Iraq. Following the Iraqi Attack on Kuwait, the US with its allies invaded Iraq. The successful siege did not end the war, which was ongoing until 2011. Later another war broke out (2013-2017 Iraq war). The city was then not besieged but a lot of firefights and general combat actions happened in Baghdad. 4

 
Baghdad